Francis J. Grandon (1879 – July 11, 1929) was an American silent film actor and director who acted in almost 100 films and directed over 100. Frank Grandon's obituary, printed in newspapers from coast-to- coast, called him "the father of movie serial motion pictures" and a mentor to many young film stars.

Early career
He was born in Chicago, Illinois. Little here is known about the early life of Francis Grandon other than he was listed as a members of Jessie May Hall’s company during an 1895 engagement at the Opera House in Portsmouth, Ohio and that he first arrived in Los Angeles in 1902, most likely as a member of a traveling repertory troupe.

Career profile in The Moving Picture World, 1916
In is January 22, 1916 issue, the trade journal The Moving Picture World announces Grandon's move to Metro Pictures, which was founded just a year earlier. The publication, as part of that announcement, also provides the following profile on his career up to that date:

Personal life and death
Helen S. Grandon, his wife, was a native of Indiana and eighteen years his junior when she married him around 1920 at the age of twenty-two.

Francis J. Grandon died on July 11, 1929, in Los Angeles after suffering a series of strokes over several years. In 1925 Grandon had disappeared for a number of weeks before film director Webster Cullison traced him to a Portland, Oregon hospital ward where he was recovering from his initial stroke. At the time of his death Grandon had no immediate family other than his young wife who was not mentioned in his obituary. Francis J. Grandon's funeral services  were held on Saturday, July 13, at the LeRoy Bagley Mortuary on Hollywood Boulevard.

Selected filmography

Barb Wire (1922)
 The Adventures of Kathlyn (1916)
 Playing with Fire (1916)
 The Soul Market (1916)
 The Lure of Heart's Desire (1916)
 Rosemary, That's for Remembrance (1914)
 The Livid Flame (1914)
 To Be Called For (1914)
 A Beast at Bay (1912)
 Mrs. Matthews, Dressmaker (1912)
 The Blind Princess and the Poet (1911)
 The Last Drop of Water (1911)
 The Indian Brothers (1911)
 Enoch Arden (1911)
 The Lonedale Operator (1911)
 Was He a Coward? (1911)
 The Lily of the Tenements (1911)
 What Shall We Do with Our Old? (1911)
 His Trust (1911)
 Ramona (1910)
 The House with Closed Shutters (1910)
 What the Daisy Said (1910)
 In the Border States (1910)
 The Modern Prodigal (1910) as At Post Office
 A Mohawk's Way (1910) as Indian medicine man

Sources

External links
 

1879 births
1929 deaths
American male film actors
American film directors
Male actors from Chicago
American male silent film actors
Silent film directors
20th-century American male actors